The Taylor Complex Fire was a 2004 wildfire in Alaska that consumed approximately  of land. By acreage, it was the largest wildfire in the United States between 1997 and 2007.

References

Wildfires in Alaska
2004 wildfires in the United States
2004 in Alaska
2004 fires in the United States